Rising Stars is a 2010 American teen musical drama film. The film was directed by Dan Millican. Rising Stars stars Kyle Riabko, Lauren Ashley Carter, Leon Thomas III, Fisher Stevens, Barry Corbin, and Rebecca St. James and follows three teen musical groups competing in a music video competition. The film is distributed by Screen Media Films and was released to three theaters on October 22, 2010.

Plot
A family musical with heart, Rising Stars explores the sacrifices that come with fame in reality television-obsessed culture. Challenged with creating songs and music videos, three musical acts find more than their futures on the line when the competition gets fierce and their lives are caught on tape broadcast to the nation. Egos clash and worlds collide as these teens find how far they will go to win the coveted prize and achieve stardom.

Cast
 Kyle Riabko as Chance
 Lauren Ashley Carter as Natalie
 Leon Thomas III as JR
 Barry Corbin* 
 Fisher Stevens as Mo
 Rebecca St. James as Kari
 Catherine Mary Stewart as Ms. Cage
 Graham Patrick Martin as Garrett
 Natalie Hall as Brenna
 Jason Edward Cook as Petey
 Jessie Payo as Eigsh
 Jordan Walker Ross as Jeremiah
 Pierce Cravens as Kevin

Soundtrack
A soundtrack for the film was released on October 19, 2010, to iTunes. It features fourteen original songs from the motion picture. The first single from the soundtrack was released on October 6, 2010. Entitled "It's You", the song is performed by Jessie Payo and Leon Thomas III, who both star in the film.

The score was composed by Ryan Shore.

Home media
The film was released to DVD on February 22, 2010.

References

External links
 
 
 

2010 films
Films scored by Ryan Shore
2010s English-language films
American teen musical films
American teen drama films
2010s American films